P15 is a regional road (P-Highway) in Volyn Oblast and Lviv Oblast Ukraine. It runs north-south and connects Kovel with Zhovkva.

Main route
Main route and connections to/intersections with other highways in Ukraine.

Former route
The P15 originally ran from Kaniv to Kremenchuk. This was redesignated as P10 in 2009.

Notes

See also

 Roads in Ukraine

References

External links
Regional Roads in Ukraine in Russian

Roads in Volyn Oblast
Roads in Lviv Oblast